Ronald Baker (1947 – 1990) was an American record producer, bassist, arranger and songwriter. He participated on many Gamble and Huff recordings and was one-third of the production team Baker-Harris-Young. He was one of The Trammps,  who are best known for their hit "Disco Inferno", which hit #11 on the Billboard Hot 100 in 1978.

In 2016, Baker was posthumously inducted into the Musicians Hall of Fame and Museum.

References

 

1947 births
1990 deaths
20th-century American bass guitarists
MFSB members
Salsoul Orchestra members
The Trammps members